This is a list of ships built by A & J Inglis, Glasgow, Scotland.

Ships

Cancelled orders

References

 Inglis
A. & J. Inglis